Paul Weller (born 3 April 1959) is an Australian politician and was the Nationals member for Rodney in the Victorian Legislative Assembly from 2006 to 2014.

Weller is a former dairy farmer from Lockington in Northern Victoria. Before entering Parliament he served as President of the Victorian Farmers Federation. Weller won pre-selection for Rodney after the retirement of Noel Maughan.  Despite unfavourable preferences from the Labor Party, Weller won 40% of the primary vote and 54% of the two-party-preferred vote against the Liberal candidate.

In February 2014, he was elected Deputy Speaker of the Legislative Assembly under Christine Fyffe. His seat was abolished before the 2014 election and he contested the Legislative Council seat of Northern Victoria in the unwinnable fourth position on the Coalition ticket.

External links
Official Website
The Nationals – Victoria

1959 births
Living people
Members of the Victorian Legislative Assembly
National Party of Australia members of the Parliament of Victoria
Australian farmers
21st-century Australian politicians